Eucalyptus magnificata, commonly known as blue box or northern blue box, is a species of small tree or sometimes a mallee that is restricted to a small area of New South Wales. It has rough, fibrous or flaky bark on the trunk and larger branches, smooth bark above, broadly lance-shaped to egg-shaped leaves, flower buds in groups of seven, white or pale yellow flowers and conical fruit.

Description
It has rough, fibrous or flaky bark on the trunk and larger branches, smooth greyish bark above. The flower buds are arranged in groups of seven, either in leaf axils or on the end of branchlets, sometimes on a branching peduncle. Flowering occurs in June and November and the flowers are white, pale yellow or lemon-coloured.

Taxonomy and naming
Eucalyptus magnificata was first formally described in 1990 by Lawrie Johnson and Ken Hill from a specimen collected by Richard Cambage near Uralla in 1917. The specific epithet (magnificata) is a Latin word meaning "magnified", referring to the leaves, buds and fruit which are larger than in related eucalypts.

Distribution and habitat
Blue box grows in grassy woodland on shallow soils near Armidale in New South Wales and Stanthorpe in south-eastern Queensland.

Conservation status
This eucalypt is classified as "endangered" under the New South Wales Government Biodiversity Conservation Act 2016.

References

magnificata
Myrtales of Australia
Flora of New South Wales
Flora of Queensland
Trees of Australia
Plants described in 1990
Taxa named by Lawrence Alexander Sidney Johnson
Taxa named by Ken Hill (botanist)